The Manager of Opposition Business in the House, also known as the Leader of Opposition Business in the House, is a member of the Shadow Cabinet of Queensland responsible for working with the Leader of the House on the management and scheduling of business in the Legislative Assembly. The holder of the post is ex officio a member of the Committee of the Legislative Assembly unless the position is designated to another Opposition member. The Committee has responsibility for the way the body is run. The Leader of Opposition Business is one of the few Opposition members to receive a government salary in addition to that earned as a member of Parliament.

List of officeholders

Notes

See also
 Manager of Government Business (Queensland)
 Manager of Opposition Business in the House (Australia)
 Leader of the House (Australia)
 Premier of Queensland
 Speaker of the Legislative Assembly of Queensland
 Government of Queensland

References

Parliament of Queensland
Queensland-related lists
Opposition of Australia